My Name Is Anna Magnani is a 1979 documentary film written and directed by Chris Vermorcken. It is about the life and career of Italian actress Anna Magnani. The film features appearances and interviews by Federico Fellini, Leonor Fini, Claude Autant-Lara, Giulietta Masina, Marcello Mastroianni, and Franco Zeffirelli, among others.

My Name Is Anna Magnani received the André Cavens Award for Best Film given by the Belgian Film Critics Association (UCC).

References

External links 
 

1979 films
1979 documentary films
Belgian documentary films
Italian documentary films
1970s Italian films